The Sicus is a genus of fly.

Sicus may also refer to:

 Another name for the Andean panpipe Siku

See also 
 Sicu (disambiguation)
 Siku (disambiguation)